Helcystogramma imagibicuneum is a moth in the family Gelechiidae. It was described by Hou-Hun Li and Hui Zhen in 2011. It is found in Shaanxi, China.

The wingspan is about 9.5 mm. The forewings are greyish brown, with scattered dark brown scales, blackish brown along the apex and termen and blackish brown mottled with yellow above the tornus. There are two oblique stripes and the costal margin has two short white streaks in the distal quarter. There is also a triangular black-brown spot near the end of the cell and two fasciae near the termen. The hindwings are brown.

References

Moths described in 2011
imagibicuneum
Moths of Asia